Makanpur (formerly known as Khairabad) is a town in Kanpur district in the state of Uttar Pradesh, India. Makanpur is a town in the tehsil of Bilhaur. Makanpur is well connected by rail and road. The nearest city to Makanpur is Araul, which is 4 km away.

It is also known for the dargah shrine of the Sufi saint of Madariya Sufi order, Badiuddin Zinda Shah Madar. During his annual Urs celebrations, followers of the order congregate at the shrine.

References

 Hazrat Sayed Badiuddin Zinda Shah Madar Dargah and Biography

Cities and towns in Kanpur Nagar district